Mesha Sankranti (also called Mesha Sankramana or Hindu Solar New Year) refers to the first day of the solar cycle year, that is the solar New Year in the Hindu luni-solar calendar. The Hindu calendar also has a lunar new year, which is religiously more significant. The solar cycle year is significant in Assamese, Odia, Punjabi, Malayalam, Tamil, and Bengali calendars.

The day represents specific solar movement according to ancient Sanskrit texts. Mesha Sankranti is one of the twelve Sankranti in the Indian calendar. The concept is also found in Indian astrology texts wherein it refers to the day of transition of sun into the Aries zodiac sign.

The day is important in solar and lunisolar calendars followed on the subcontinent. Mesha Sankranti falls on 13 April usually, sometimes 14 April. This day is the basis for major Hindu, Sikh and Buddhist festivals, of which Vaisakhi and Vesak are the best known.

It is related to the equivalent Buddhist calendar-based New Year festivals in Thailand, Laos, Cambodia, Myanmar, Sri Lanka, parts of Northeast India, parts of Vietnam and Xishuangbanna, China; collectively referred to as Songkran.

Etymology
The phrase Mesha Sankranti consists of two Sanskrit words. Sankranti literally means "going from one place to another, transference, course change, entry into" particularly in the context of sun or planets, while Mesha means sheep or Aries constellation. The term Mesha Sankranti connotes a specific day based on time keeping practices developed in the ancient Sanskrit texts of the Vedanga field of study called Jyotisha and later texts such as the Surya Siddhanta.

Observance

Many regional calendars have two elements: lunar and solar. The lunar element is based on the movement of the moon and counts each month from either new moon to new moon, full moon to full moon, or the day after the full moon to the next full moon. The lunar element forms the basis of religious calendars and begin the year in Chaitra. Many regions begin the local new year with the commencement of the lunar calendar: Gudi Padwa in Maharashtra and Goa; Cheti Chand for the Sindhi Hindus; and Navreh for the Kashmiri Hindus. In Gujarat, the regional year commences with the lunar month of Kartika after Diwali.

The solar element of lunisolar calendars begin the year on Mesha Sankranti. This day is observed by people across India, even in regions which begin the new year using the lunar calendar. However, some regions also begin the regional new year on Mesha Sankranti.

See also
 Songkran, the term used to refer to the Buddhist calendar-based New Year festivals of April
 South and Southeast Asian New Year, observations based on mesha sankranti
 Zodiac

References

New Year celebrations
Festivals in India
Hindu astrology
Hindu astronomy
April observances
Hindu festivals